Jon Van Caneghem (born 1962/1963) is an American video game director, designer and producer. He is best known for launching development studio New World Computing in 1983, making his design debut in 1986 with Might and Magic Book One: The Secret of the Inner Sanctum. During the company's 20-year lifespan, Van Caneghem was involved in the creation and direction of several franchises, including the Might and Magic role-playing series and the spin-off Heroes of Might and Magic and King's Bounty strategy series.

Early life 

Van Caneghem was raised on the Sunset Strip in West Hollywood, California, United States, by his mother, an artist, and his stepfather, a neurologist at University of California, Los Angeles (UCLA). He attended grade school at Lycée Français de Los Angeles and his collegiate alma mater is UCLA, where he started as a pre-med student and graduated with a degree in computer science.

Career 

In 1983, Van Caneghem founded New World Computing, a publisher and developer of computer and console games.

Their first title was the medieval fantasy Might and Magic: Secret of the Inner Sanctum—one of the first role-playing games to feature detailed drawings of both indoor and outdoor locations. It debuted in 1986 for the Apple II. The series went on to include nine bestselling games, all of which Van Caneghem co-created. In 1990 Van Caneghem released King's Bounty, the forerunner of the Heroes of Might and Magic series of seven games which feature turn-based, fantasy-themed conflicts in which players control armies of mythical creatures.

In the following 20 years as president and CEO of New World Computing, Van Caneghem oversaw the publishing of more than 250 titles worldwide.

Van Caneghem sold New World Computing to developer and publisher 3DO in 1996 for US$13 million. He remained with 3DO as president and "lead visionary" until 2003 when 3DO filed for bankruptcy and eliminated its New World Computing division. The rights to the Might and Magic name were purchased for $1.3 million by Ubisoft, which revived the franchise with a new series under the same name.

From 2004 to 2005, Van Caneghem worked at NCSoft as executive producer of a massively multiplayer online game. In 2006 Van Caneghem left NCSoft and launched Trion World Network, headquartered in Redwood City, California, after securing more than $100 million in investment capital from Time Warner, NBC Universal, GE and Bertelsmann. Trion produces server-side games.

Van Caneghem left Trion in 2009 and joined Electronic Arts where he headed the video game giant's Command & Conquer brand. Van Caneghem was responsible for extending the series online. On 29 October 2013, EA cancelled the development of the Command & Conquer game and closed the development studio.

In 2014, Caneghem founded VC Mobile Entertainment (VCME) with the goal to produce and publish iOS and Android games. Caneghem secured $4.5 million in capital investment from companies like Tencent and Pacific Sky Investments. VCME is based in Los Angeles, and currently has around 15 employees.

Their first game, Creature Quest, is a mobile game focused on collection of creatures with which to quest and explore. It is an RPG with turn-based combat similar to Might & Magic and isometric exploration reminiscent of Heroes of Might & Magic. It was launched globally early 2017, after a successful limited test launch in selected countries in Europe and Australia.

Awards 

Van Caneghem was inducted into the Computer Gaming World Hall of Fame in 2004 for Strategy and Role-Playing. The first Might and Magic games is number 44 in Computer Gaming World'''s Hall of Fame, and Heroes of Might and Magic II is number 31. Heroes of Might and Magic I won Strategy Game of the Year from Computer Gaming World, Turn-Based Strategy Game of the Year from Strategy Plus, Editor's Choice from PC Gamer, and Golden Triad from Computer Game Review.

 Personal life 

Van Caneghem lives in Los Angeles, California and has a daughter, Amanda.

 Racing 

Van Caneghem is an avid race car driver and has won or placed in races regularly since the '90s. This hobby grew from his unofficial races down Mulholland Drive in the Hollywood hills and in the early '90s grew into a more serious hobby on racetracks across the country,Track Lap Records for Track Buttonwillow RP 25CCW from CalClub.com including winning the West Coast Formula Ford championship. He attended the Skip Barber Racing School during this time.

Van Caneghem has competed in over 100 races with dozens of wins with the Sports Car Club of America where he competed in GT2, CSR, DSR, S7, SGT, and Pro7. With Nasa Pro Racing, he competed in Mazda-GT, ST2, STR2. Van Caneghem also won races with Cal Club, including the SGT2 Season Winner in 2005.

 Games 

 Might and Magic I, 1986, designer/programmer
 Might and Magic II, 1988, designer/programmer
 Nuclear War, 1989, designer
 Tunnels & Trolls: Crusaders of Khazan, 1990, director
 King's Bounty, 1990, designer
 Might and Magic III, 1991, director/designer
 Planet's Edge, 1992, director/designer
 Might and Magic IV: Clouds of Xeen, 1992, director/designer
 Might and Magic V: Darkside of Xeen, 1993, director/designer
 Zephyr, 1994, designer
 Inherit the Earth: Quest for the Orb, 1994, executive producer
 Hammer of the Gods, 1994, executive producer
 Wetlands, 1995, executive producer
 Multimedia Celebrity Poker, 1995, original concept/executive producer
 Heroes of Might and Magic: A Strategic Quest, 1995, designer
 Anvil of Dawn, 1995, executive producer
 Empire II: The Art of War, 1995, executive producer
 Heroes of Might and Magic II, 1996, director/designer
 Heroes of Might and Magic II: The Price of Loyalty, 1997, designer
 Might and Magic VI: The Mandate of Heaven, 1998, designer
 Might and Magic VII: For Blood and Honor, 1999, designer
 Heroes of Might and Magic III: The Restoration of Erathia, 1999, designer
 Crusaders of Might and Magic, 1999, special thanks
 Might and Magic VIII: Day of the Destroyer, 2000, designer
 Heroes Chronicles: Warlords of the Wastelands, 2000, designer
 Heroes Chronicles: Masters of the Elements, 2000, designer
 Heroes Chronicles: Conquest of the Underworld, 2000, designer
 Heroes Chronicles: Clash of the Dragons, 2000, designer
 Heroes of Might and Magic: Quest for the Dragon Bone Staff, 2001, designer
 Heroes Chronicles: The Final Chapters, 2001, designer
 Legends of Might and Magic, 2001, designer
 Command & Conquer, cancelled
 Creature Quest'', 2017

References

External links 

 
 

American video game designers
Living people
New World Computing
Year of birth uncertain
1960s births